"Mike's Song" is a song by the rock band Phish. Originally written in 1985, and debuting that year on March 16, bass player Mike Gordon's song has been played a total of 488 times (appearing in 28.26% of all of Phish live shows), the third most played song in Phish history (after "You Enjoy Myself" and "Possum").

Release

Despite being one of the band's most popular songs it wasn't until 1997–12 years after its debut, that it finally was officially released on a Phish album when a live version from Hamburg, Germany was released on Slip Stitch and Pass.   It has since appeared on numerous live Phish releases including Hampton Comes Alive, Hampton/Winston-Salem '97, and Chicago '94.   No studio recording of the song has ever been commercially released.

"Mike's Groove"
"Mike's Song" is the first song in a series of three songs known to Phish fans as "Mike's Groove", which traditionally consists of "Mike's Song" > "I Am Hydrogen" > Weekapaug Groove. “I Am Hydrogen” may be replaced with other songs such as “Lawn Boy” on ‘Slip Stitch and Pass’.

References

Phish songs
1985 songs